Maria Vladimirovna  Zakharova (born 24 December 1975) is the Director of the Information and Press Department of the Ministry of Foreign Affairs of the Russian Federation (Spokeswoman for the Ministry of Foreign Affairs of the Russian Federation) since 2015. 

She has a degree of Candidate in Historical Sciences, the Russian equivalent of a PhD.

Early life and education
Zakharova was born to a family of diplomats on 24 december 1975. Her father, Vladimir Zakharov, moved the family to Beijing in 1981 when he was appointed to the Soviet embassy there. The family left Beijing for Moscow in 1993, two years after the Soviet Union had collapsed. Her mother, Irina Zakharova, is an art historian who has worked at Moscow's Pushkin Museum. 

In 1998, Maria Zakharova graduated from the Faculty of International Journalism at the Moscow State Institute of International Relations in the field of orientalism and journalism. Her pre-diploma apprenticeship was carried out at the Russian Embassy in Beijing.

Career

Early career
From 2003 to 2005 and from 2008 to 2011, she worked at the Information and Press Department of the Ministry of Foreign Affairs of the Russian Federation. From 2005 to 2008, she was the press secretary of the Permanent Mission of the Russian Federation to the United Nations in New York City.
 
From 2011 to 10 August 2015, Zakharova was the Deputy Head of the Department of Information and Press of the Ministry of Foreign Affairs of the Russian Federation. Her duties included organizing and conducting briefings of the Ministry of Foreign Affairs spokesman, the organization of work of official Ministry accounts in social networks and information support of foreign visits of the Minister of Foreign Affairs.

Zakharova is known for her participation in political talk shows on Russian television and for contributing commentary on sensitive political issues on social media. She is one of the most quoted Russian diplomats. She often opposed Jen Psaki (the official representative of the US State Department before 31 March 2015).

As press secretary of ministry of foreign affairs
On 10 August 2015, by order of the Ministry of Foreign Affairs, Zakharova was appointed director of the Information and Press Department. Zakharova became the first woman to hold this post.

In 2016, she was chosen as one of BBC's 100 Women.

In 2017, Zakharova accused the European Union of hypocrisy over its different behaviour towards the separatist crises in Crimea and Catalonia, after hundreds were injured by Spanish security forces preventing Catalans from voting during the Catalan independence referendum, saying "I see and read what is happening in Catalonia. And Europe will say something to us about the referendum in Crimea and the protection of human rights".
On 28 April 2017, Zakharova appeared on Yahoo! News discussing the current international relations with Katie Couric. When Couric brought up the reports of torture against LGBT individuals by the Chechen government, Zakharova said that Russia was conducting an investigation into the matter.

In June 2019, Reuters reported that Zakharova "offered a tribute to those who died on the western front of World War II and said Moscow appreciated the Allied war effort", adding "It should of course not be exaggerated. And especially not at the same time as diminishing the Soviet Union’s titanic efforts, without which this victory simply would not have happened". Zakharova stated, "As historians note, the Normandy landing did not have a decisive impact on the outcome of World War II and the Great Patriotic War. It had already been pre-determined as a result of the Red Army’s victories, mainly at Stalingrad (in late 1942) and Kursk (in mid-1943). There was a wish to wait for the maximum weakening of Germany’s military power from its enormous losses in the east, while reducing losses in the west."

In 2021, Zakharova criticised a NATO military exercise called Defender-Europe 21, one of the largest NATO-led military exercises in Europe in decades, which began in March 2021. It included "nearly simultaneous operations across more than 30 training areas" in Estonia, Bulgaria, Romania and other countries. She claimed that by conducting these exercises, NATO is gathering a "strike fist" near Russia's borders. On 15 April 2021, she stated that in 2021 alone "NATO is planning seven military exercises in Ukraine. The active phase of the Defender Europe 2021 exercise, the most extensive exercise for many years, is to commence near Ukraine soon."

On 16 February 2022, Zakharova ridiculed Western media predictions of an imminent invasion of Ukraine by Russia when she had mockingly asked for the schedule of Russian invasion so that she could, ostensibly, "plan [her] vacation" accordingly. On 28 February 2022, she wrote that "Russia did not start a war, it is ending it" and claimed that Russia was acting to end the "systematic extermination of the Donbas population" that had allegedly been ongoing since 2014.

On 2 June 2022, Zakharova warned that Turkey's invasion of northern Syria "would be a direct violation of Syria’s sovereignty and territorial integrity" and would "cause a further escalation of tensions in Syria."

On 15 June 2022, she praised Russia's strategic partnership with China, adding that "Energy supplies are steadily increasing: China knows what it wants and doesn't shoot itself in the foot. While to the west of Moscow, they shoot themselves in the head." 

On 5 July 2022, Zakharova warned that Israel's incursions and strikes into southern Syria "is completely unacceptable. We strongly condemn such irresponsible actions that violate Syria's sovereignty and the basic norms of international law, and we demand their unconditional cessation."

Sanctions
On 23 February, the day before the 2022 Russian invasion of Ukraine, she was sanctioned by the European Union alongside other prominent Russian media figures, as "a central figure of the government propaganda," and for having "promoted the deployment of Russian forces in Ukraine." The sanctions include being placed on a No Fly list and the freezing of assets. On 8 March, Australia also imposed sanctions on Zakharova. On 18 March, Zakharova was included in Japan's expanded sanctions list. US Treasury sanctioned Zakharova in June. 

Sanctioned by New Zealand in relation to the 2022 Russian invasion of Ukraine.

Controversies
On 13 November 2016, Zakharova was criticised for making anti-semitic jokes on Russian state television that the U.S. election results were the result of a Russian Jewish conspiracy, stating "If you want to know what will happen in America, who do you have to talk to? You have to talk to our people in Brighton Beach, naturally". Brighton Beach is home to a large Russian Jewish community. She also spoke in a stereotypical Jewish accent.

Personal life
On 7 November 2005, Zakharova married Andrei Makarov at the Russian Consulate in New York City. The couple have a daughter, Maryana, born in August 2010.

References

External links

|-

 Biography online TASS
 

1975 births
Living people
Russian nationalists
Anti-Americanism
Antisemitism in Russia
Russian conspiracy theorists
Anti-Ukrainian sentiment in Russia
21st-century diplomats
Moscow State Institute of International Relations alumni
Journalists from Moscow
Russian propagandists
Russian women journalists
Russian women in politics
Russian women diplomats
BBC 100 Women
Diplomats from Moscow
Ambassador Extraordinary and Plenipotentiary (Russian Federation)
Specially Designated Nationals and Blocked Persons List
Russian individuals subject to the U.S. Department of the Treasury sanctions
Russian individuals subject to European Union sanctions
Fugitives wanted by Ukraine